East Flintshire was a parliamentary constituency in Flintshire, North Wales.  It returned one Member of Parliament (MP) to the House of Commons of the Parliament of the United Kingdom.

The constituency was created for the 1950 general election, and abolished for the 1983 general election.

Boundaries 
The Borough of Flint, the Urban Districts of Buckley, Connah's Quay, and Holywell, and the Rural Districts of Hawarden and Overton.

Members of Parliament

Election results

Elections in the 1950s

In the 1959 general election Flintshire East had the 9th highest turnout of any UK constituency.

Elections in the 1960s

In the 1964 general election Flintshire East had the 2nd highest turnout of any UK constituency.

In the 1966 general election Flintshire East had the 5th highest turnout of any UK constituency.

Elections in the 1970s

References 

History of Flintshire
Historic parliamentary constituencies in North Wales
Constituencies of the Parliament of the United Kingdom established in 1950
Constituencies of the Parliament of the United Kingdom disestablished in 1983